Charles Oliver Hixson, Jr. (born 1947) is a former American football quarterback who played at Southern Methodist University in Dallas, Texas. After leading the nation in passing as a sophomore, he was awarded the Sammy Baugh Trophy in 1968. The   quarterback had 265 completions in 468 attempts for 3,103 yards, 23 interceptions, 21 touchdowns, and 2,995 yards of total offense that year.

In his three seasons at SMU (1968–1970), Hixson established several school career records that stood for many years:
 Passes completed: 642 (surpassed by Ben Hicks in 2018)
 Passes attempted: 1,115 (surpassed by Ben Hicks in 2018)
 Passing yards: 7,179 (surpassed by Ben Hicks in 2018)
 Passing touchdowns: 40 (surpassed by Justin Willis in 2007 and others subsequently)
 Passes had intercepted: 56  (current)

Hixson was a 13th round selection (328th overall pick) in the 1971 NFL Draft by the Kansas City Chiefs.

References

External links
90 Greatest Moments in SMU Football History: No. 29 :: Hixson leads nation in passing (1968)

1947 births
Living people
Players of American football from San Antonio
American football quarterbacks
SMU Mustangs football players